Eoreuma densellus, the wainscot grass-veneer, is a moth in the family Crambidae. It was described by Zeller in 1881. It is found in North America, where it has been recorded from Minnesota to Connecticut, south to Texas and Florida.

Adults are on wing from April to October in most of the range, but year round in Florida.

References

Haimbachiini
Moths described in 1881